Olympiada is a town in the northeastern part of the peninsula of Chalkidiki, Central Macedonia, Greece, with 649 inhabitants in the 2001 census. It is a municipal district of the same name, within the municipality of Stagira-Akanthos. Main occupation of its residents is tourism and fishing. It is located 35 km from Ierissos and 90 km from Thessaloniki. Approximately 700 meters from it lies the archaeological site of ancient Stagira. The area is declared as a protected zone by the Natura 2000 programme.

Name
Olympiada took its name from Olympias, a princess of Ancient Epirus and the mother of Alexander the Great.

History
The village was founded by Greek refugees, who came from Asia Minor in 1923. Originally, the land was marshy and malaria was a main problem for the population. Many of the refugees died and others migrated to other places, in Macedonia and in Thrace.

References

External links

Populated places in Chalkidiki